Ichneutica sollennis is a moth of the family Noctuidae. This species is endemic to New Zealand. This species is known from the eastern and central areas of the southern South Island. It inhabits alpine zones and has been collected in tussock grasslands. The life history of this species is unknown. Although the host species is currently unknown it has been hypothesised that this species have grass or grass like plants as host plants. Adults are on the wing from November to February and are attracted to light.

Taxonomy 
This species was first described by Edward Meyrick in 1914 and named Aletia sollennis. Meyrick used two male specimens collected by George Howes at Waipori in November and January. Howes passed the specimens to Alfred Philpott who in turn passed them to Meyrick. The lectotype specimen is held at the Natural History Museum, London. In 2019 Robert Hoare undertook a major review of New Zealand Noctuidae. During this review the genus Ichneutica was greatly expanded and the genus Aletia was subsumed into that genus as a synonym. As a result of this review, this species is now known as Ichneutica sollennis.

Description 

Meyrick described this species as follows:

I. sollennis has a plain brown shade to its forewing with dark wing veins and white dots across the forewings. The adult male has a wingspan of between 32 and 35 mm and the female has a wingspan of between 32 and 33 mm.

Distribution 
This species is endemic to New Zealand. It is found in South Island, in the eastern and central areas of the southern part.

Habitat 
This species inhabits alpine zones and has been known to be collected in tussock grasslands.

Behaviour 
The adults of this species are on the wing from November to February. Adults of this species are attracted to light.

Life history and host species 
The life history of this species is unknown as are the host species of its larvae. Hoare hypothesises that the preferred habitat of this species and shape of I. sollennis' ovipositor suggest that this species have grass or grass like plants as host plants.

References

Hadeninae
Moths of New Zealand
Endemic fauna of New Zealand
Moths described in 1914
Taxa named by Edward Meyrick
Endemic moths of New Zealand